KMAX (840 kHz) is a commercial AM radio station broadcasting a talk radio format. Licensed to Colfax, Washington, the station serves the Pullman - Moscow - South Eastern Washington region and is owned by Inland Northwest Broadcasting, LLC.

By day, KMAX transmits with 10,000 watts and broadcasts a non-directional signal. As 840 AM is a United States clear-channel frequency reserved for Class A WHAS in Louisville, Kentucky, it must reduce nighttime power to only 280 watts to protect the skywave signal of WHAS. The transmitter is off Hilty Road in Colfax.

Programming
On late weekday mornings, KMAX has an hour of local news and talk.  The rest of the weekday schedule is made up of nationally syndicated conservative talk show hosts:  Glenn Beck, Sean Hannity, Mark Levin, Dave Ramsey, Lars Larson, Mike Gallagher and Michael Medved.

Weekends feature shows on money, health, gardening, home repair and pets.  Syndicated weekend hosts include Dennis Prager and repeats of weekday shows.  KMAX also serves as the Moscow/Pullman network affiliate station of Seattle Seahawks football broadcasts.

History
Four years earlier, co-owned KRAO-FM (102.5) came on the air. In June 2005, both stations were acquired by Inland Northwest Broadcasting.

References

External links

MAX
Radio stations established in 1998
1998 establishments in Washington (state)
News and talk radio stations in the United States